Gartzain is a village located in the municipality of Baztan, Navarre, in Navarre province, Spain, Spain. As of 2020, it has a population of 232.

Geography 
Gartzain is located 50km north-northeast of Pamplona.

References

Populated places in Navarre